Panpatti Union is a union of Galachipa Upazila of Patuakhali District in Bangladesh. This was the last war front of Patukhali in 1971, and a monument remains. During the war of liberation in 1971 three members of the Pak Army were killed in a skirmish between the Pak army and the rebels at Panpatti. The Pak army raided the villages Chikani Kandi and Dakua on 8 May, killed 29 villagers and sacked some houses.

References 

Populated places in Patuakhali District
Unions of Galachipa Upazila
Unions of Patuakhali District